Steromphala is a genus of sea snails, marine gastropod mollusks in the subfamily Cantharidinae of the family Trochidae, the top snails.

Species
Species within the genus Steromphala include:
 
 Steromphala adansonii (Payraudeau, 1826)
 Steromphala adriatica (Philippi, 1844)
 Steromphala albida (Gmelin, 1791)
 † Steromphala biangulata (Eichwald, 1830) 
 † Steromphala brevispira (Harmer, 1923) 
 † Steromphala brocchii (Mayer in Cocconi, 1873) 
 Steromphala cineraria (Linnaeus, 1758)
 † Steromphala cineroides (Wood, 1842) 
 † Steromphala dertosulcata (Sacco, 1896) 
 † Steromphala distefanoi (Crema, 1903) 
 Steromphala divaricata (Linnaeus, 1758)
 † Steromphala insignis (Millet, 1854) 
 Steromphala leucophaea (Philippi, 1836)
 † Steromphala milleti (Ceulemans, Van Dingenen & Landau, 2016) 
 † Steromphala monodontoides (Millet, 1854)
 Steromphala nebulosa (Philippi, 1849)
 Steromphala nivosa (A. Adams, 1853)
 † Steromphala olympica (Garilli, Crisci & Messina, 2005)
 Steromphala pennanti (Philippi, 1846)
 † Steromphala perconica (Sacco, 1896) 
 † Steromphala pliocenica (Greco, 1970) 
 † Steromphala provosti (Ceulemans, Van Dingenen & Landau, 2016) 
 Steromphala racketti (Payraudeau, 1826)
 Steromphala rarilineata (Michaud, 1829)
 † Steromphala simulans (De Stefani & Pantanelli, 1878) 
 Steromphala spratti (Forbes, 1844)
 † Steromphala subcineraria (d'Orbigny, 1852) †
 † Steromphala taurolaevis (Sacco, 1896) †
 † Steromphala terrerossae (Spadini, 1986)
 Steromphala tumida (Montagu, 1803)
 Steromphala umbilicalis (da Costa, 1778)
 Steromphala umbilicaris (Linnaeus, 1758)
 Steromphala varia (Linnaeus, 1758)
 † Steromphala verae (Chirli, 2004) 

Species brought into synonymy
 Steromphala crimeana Anistratenko & Starobogatov, 1991: synonym of Steromphala rarilineata (Michaud, 1829)

References

External links
 Gray, J. E. (1847). A list of the genera of recent Mollusca, their synonyma and types. Proceedings of the Zoological Society of London. 15: 129-219. Date of publication November 1847.
 Monterosato T. A. (di) (1889 (1 gennaio)). Coquilles marines marocaines. Journal de Conchyliologie 37(1): 20-40; 37(2): 112-121
 Sacco, F. (1896). I molluschi dei terreni terziarii del Piemonte e della Liguria. Parte XXI. (Naricidae, Modulidae, Phasianellidae, Turbinidae, Delphinulidae, Cyclostrematidae, Tornidae). Carlo Clausen, Torino, 64 pp., 4 pl
 Monterosato T. A. (di) (1884). Nomenclatura generica e specifica di alcune conchiglie mediterranee. Palermo, Virzi, 152 pp
 Monterosato T. A. (di). (1888-1889). Molluschi del Porto di Palermo. Specie e varietà. Bullettino della Società Malacologica Italiana. 13: 161-180 [15 October 1888; 14: 75-81]
 Fischer P. (1880-1887). Manuel de Conchyliologie et de Paléontologie Conchyliologique. Paris, Savy pp. XXIV + 1369 + pl. 23
 Friele H. (1877) Tungebevæbningen hos de Norske Rhipidoglossa. Archiv for mathematik og naturvidenskab, 2: 199-317, pl. 1-5
 ffenzeller S., Haar N. & Steiner G. (2017). Revision of the genus complex Gibbula: an integrative approach to delineating the Eastern Mediterranean genera Gibbula Risso, 1826, Steromphala Gray, 1847, and Phorcus Risso, 1826 using DNA-barcoding and geometric morphometrics (Vetigastropoda, Trochoidea). Organisms Diversity & Evolution. 17(4): 789-812

 
Trochidae